Glezos ( or ) is a Greek surname. Notable people with this surname include:

 Lakis Glezos (1947–2007), Greece national team footballer
 Manolis Glezos (1922–2020), Greek politician and member of the Greek Resistance
 (1925–1944) Greek resistance member and brother of Manolis

Greek-language surnames
Surnames